Viktor Arkadyevich Bely (14 January 1904 – 6 March 1983), was a Soviet composer and social activist.

Bely was born in Berdichev, in the Kiev Governorate of the Russian Empire (present-day Ukraine). In 1929 he graduated from the Moscow Conservatory and later taught on the faculty of that school from 1935–1948. In 1939 he became a member of Union of Soviet Composers. He was awarded the Stalin Prize in 1952 and was named an honored artist of the Russian Soviet Federative Socialist Republic in 1956. In 1980 he was endowed with the honorary title of People's Artist of the RSFSR.

Selected works
Chamber music
 Poème (Поэма) for viola and piano (1921)
 Sonata for violin and piano (1953)

Piano
 Variations (Вариации) (1921)
 Piano Sonata No. 1 (1923)
 2 Fugues (2 фуги) (1925)
 Piano Sonata No. 2 (1926)
 Lyrical Sonatina (Лирическая сонатина) (1928)
 3 Miniatures on Bashkortostani Themes (3 миниатюры на башк. темы) (1939)
 Piano Sonata No. 3 (1941)
 Piano Sonata No. 4 (1946)
 16 Preludes on Soviet Melodies (16 прелюдий на мелодии народов СССР) (1947)
 5 Pieces on Belarusian Folk Themes (5 пьес на белорусских народные темы) (1950)
 4 Pieces on Tajikistani Themes (4 пьесы на таджикистана темы) (1955)
 10 Pieces for Children (10 детских пьес) (1967)

References

1904 births
1983 deaths
20th-century composers
20th-century Russian male musicians
People from Berdychiv
People from Berdichevsky Uyezd
Moscow Conservatory alumni
Academic staff of Moscow Conservatory
People's Artists of the RSFSR
Stalin Prize winners
Recipients of the Order of the Red Banner of Labour
Ukrainian Jews
Russian male composers
Soviet male composers